Yemane is a male given name of Ethiopian and Eritrean origin that may refer to:

Yemane Baria (1949–1997), Eritrean songwriter, composer and singer
Yemane Gebreab (born 1954), Eritrean political advisor
Yemane Haileselassie (born 1998), Eritrean male steeplechase runner
Yemane Negassi (born 1946), Ethiopian former cyclist
Yemane Tsegay (born 1985), Ethiopian long distance runner

Ethiopian given names